QQ Browser is a web browser developed by Mainland Chinese technology company Tencent. It utilizes two browser engines: WebKit and Trident. Previously, Tencent had developed Tencent Explorer (Tencent TE) and Tencent TT, two browsers based on the Trident engine, as well as QQ Browser versions 5 and 6, which integrated the WebKit engine.

History 
On November 20, 2000, Tencent released the first version of Tencent Explorer (Tencent Explorer, referred to as TE) and bundled it with the OICQ 2000 Preview1 1115 (now Tencent QQ). This browser is one of the earliest page viewers in mainland China, rendering pages using the Trident layout engine (known as the Internet Explorer webpage renderer).

The first version of Tencent TE includes the "Who is with me" feature, which allows OICQ users who are browsing the same web page to communicate online, but this feature raises users' concerns about personal data security. In order to eliminate user concerns, Tencent issued a statement on April 24, 2003, stating that browsing the webpage does not reveal personal data when using this feature; if users do not want to use this feature but also want to use the browser, you can choose "Invisible" mode.

In 2003, Tencent rewrote its source code on the basis of Tencent TE, and released the first version of the new browser on November 11, Tencent TT (Tencent Traveler). At this point, the software officially stripped from Tencent QQ and became an independent software. Compared with Tencent TE, Tencent TT has added personalized functions such as software skin replacement. At the same time, it also provides auxiliary functions such as mouse gesture and smart screen ads. But the "Smart Shielded Ads" feature records the content that users browse online, and stores the records in the TTraveler2.dat file in the software installation directory.

Tencent rewrote the program again in 2008 and released version 4.0 on May 7. From this version, TT opens the web page and browses it in multiple threads to improve speed and performance, but still centered on the Trident layout engine. The final version of the 4.X series is the 4.8 (1000) version released on January 5, 2011.

Dual-core QQ Browser (2010－present) 
On May 25, 2010, Tencent released QQ Browser 5.0 Preview1 version, QQ Browser began to use Webkit and Trident dual-core.

QQ Browser is jointly promoted with Search Dog Browser and Maple Browser (ChromePlus) which are also rendered using the double typesetting engine.

QQ Browser 7.0 Preview (2012) 
In October 2012, the preview version of QQ Browser 7.0 was released on the Tencent Experience Center website and was open for testing. The QQ Browser 7.0 preview version adopts the new version of the interface, and the brand is consistent with the mobile QQ Browser. Version 7.0 removes the WebKit engine and greatly simplifies functionality.

QQ Browser 8.0 (2014) 
In November 2014, QQ Browser released the official version of 8.0. The new version redesigned the appearance of the browser and added a series of new features to improve the smoothness of the browser.

QQ Browser 9.0 (2015) 
In June 2015, QQ Browser 9.0 was released. Based on the Chromium V43 engine, it achieved a 0.3 second cold boot and a 0.1 second hot boot. The web page reached “seconds open”.

QQ Browser 9.3 (2016) 
In January 2016, QQ Browser 9.3 was released, and the engine was upgraded to Chromium V47, which optimized the startup speed and web page opening speed.

QQ Browser 9.6 (2017) 
On October 18, 2017, QQ Browser 9.6 was released and the engine was upgraded to Chromium V53.

Security issues 

 The Windows and Android versions both send personal data to Tencent's servers without any encryption or with encryption that can be easily decrypted.
 Arbitrary code execution is also possible during software updates.

aiww event 
On May 30, 2011, some netizens found that Tencent appeared in the picture on the “Tencent Soft-{}-piece Center” QQ Browser introduction page. The name of “aiww” (Chinese artist Ai Weiwei) appeared. In 2011, the words "freedom of personal freedom" and "64" were used, and the words "released" in the introductory text of the browser were also bolded. After the event, the words became "Love" and "99".

See also
Sogou

Notes

References

External links 
 Official website
 Tencent TT browser product history，Tencent TT
 QQ version history details，Tencent QQ

Web browsers
Tencent
2012 software
Internet properties established in 2012